Chari (also Romanized as Chārī; also known as Chārūk (Persian: چاروك) and Charook) is a village in Khenaman Rural District, in the Central District of Rafsanjan County, Kerman Province, Iran. At the 2006 census, its population was 201, in 62 families.

References 

Populated places in Rafsanjan County